Dammit may refer to:

Music
"Dammit", a 1997 song by Blink-182
Dammit!, a 1990 album by 311
Dammit, a 1997 solo album by Fred LeBlanc
"Dammit Janet", a 1973 song from The Rocky Horror Show musical by Richard O'Brien

Other
"Dammit", a series of comedy sketches on the British TV programme A Bit of Fry and Laurie
Clutch (pin fastener), colloquially known as dammits

See also
Damn (disambiguation)